Jardim Colonial is a monorail station of São Paulo Metro. It serves Line 15-Silver, which connects the nearby neighbourhood to the Metro Line 2-Green in Vila Prudente. It's located in Avenida Ragueb Chohfi, 1400.

It was opened on 29 December 2021.

Toponymy
After toponymic studies, the station was officially named Jardim Colonial, name of the nearest neighbourhood.

Station layout

References

São Paulo Metro stations
Railway stations opened in 2021